Saint-Sulpice-de-Ruffec (literally Saint-Sulpice of Ruffec) is a commune in the Charente department in southwestern France. With 31 inhabitants (2018), it is the least populated commune of Charente.

Geography
The commune is situated in the valley of the river Tiarde. The northwest of the commune of Saint-Sulpice-de-Ruffec is watered by the Tiarde; the remaining land includes the valley's high plateau.

The village of Saint Sulpice consists of a collection of houses grouped around the church and overlooking the valley of the Tiarde and a collection of small hamlets: Le Roule  at the edge of the town of Couture, les Fantins  near Route of Champagne-Mouton-Chenon in the south of the commune, les Raffoux, Chez Bahuet near to the Tiarde, etc.

The commune of Saint-Sulpice-de-Ruffec is 10 miles southeast of Ruffec, there is one main road running through the commune the  Aunac to Champagne-Mouton road

The soil is predominantly clay.

Population

The population of Saint-Sulpice-de-Ruffec is now a mix of French nationals and British.

Economy
Agricultural: bovine and crops mainly maize, oil seed rape and sunflowers, diversification into raising of Alpaca s, for wool and breeding

Sights
The village of Saint-Sulpice is centred on its 12th-century church. Directly outside the church is a war memorial dedicated to eight people who lost their lives in the first world war (1914–1918).

On the outskirts of the commune of Saint-Sulpice-de-Ruffec, there is a memorial to a French patriot Largeau Gilbert who was shot on 26 June 1944.

See also
Communes of the Charente department

References

Communes of Charente
Charente communes articles needing translation from French Wikipedia